Veyleh (also known as Veyleh-ye Yek) is a village in Bivanij Rural District, in the Central District of Dalahu County, Kermanshah Province, Iran. At the 2006 census, its population was 260, in 50 families.

References 

Populated places in Dalahu County